James Robert Lamar (March 28, 1866 – August 11, 1923) was a U.S. Representative from Missouri.

Born in Edgar Springs, Missouri, Lamar attended the common schools and Licking (Missouri) Academy.
He taught school in Phelps and Texas Counties.
He was principal of Licking Academy in 1889.
He studied law.
He was admitted to the bar in Texas County in 1889 and practiced.
He served as prosecuting attorney of Texas County in 1890–1894.
He served as chairman of the Democratic congressional committee of the Thirteenth District of Missouri in 1894–1896.
He engaged in the practice of law in Houston, Texas County, Missouri.

Lamar was elected as a Democrat to the Fifty-eighth Congress (March 4, 1903 – March 3, 1905).
He was an unsuccessful candidate for reelection in 1904 to the Fifty-ninth Congress.

Lamar was elected to the Sixtieth Congress (March 4, 1907 – March 3, 1909).
He was an unsuccessful candidate for reelection in 1908 to the Sixty-first Congress.
He resumed the practice of law in Houston, Missouri.
He served as president of the Missouri Bar Association in 1920.
He died in St. Louis, Missouri, on August 11, 1923.
He was interred in Houston Cemetery, Houston, Missouri.

References

1866 births
1923 deaths
Democratic Party members of the United States House of Representatives from Missouri
People from Phelps County, Missouri
People from Houston, Missouri